Address translation or address resolution may refer to:

 Address Resolution Protocol or ARP, a computer networking protocol used to find out the hardware address of a host (usually a MAC address), when only the network layer address is known
 Reverse Address Resolution Protocol or RARP, a protocol used to find the network layer address of a host, based only on the hardware address.  This protocol has been rendered obsolete by both BOOTP and DHCP
 Domain name system or DNS, which is used to translate network addresses to human-recognizable domain names
 Virtual-to-physical address translation